Cantharellus quercophilus is a species of Cantharellus found in the western Gulf Coast region of the United States from Texas to Florida. The mushrooms are found growing in savanna habitats with Post Oak (Quercus stellata) and other Quercus.

References

External links

quercophilus
Fungi described in 2010
Fungi of North America